Sona Station was a railway station on the Meråker Line in the village of Sona in the municipality of Stjørdal in Trøndelag county, Norway. The station was opened on 31 December 1897. It has been unmanned since 1 March 1971.

References

Disused railway stations in Norway
Railway stations in Stjørdal
Railway stations on the Meråker Line
Railway stations opened in 1897
1897 establishments in Norway
Year of disestablishment missing